This is a list of women's magazines from around the world. These are magazines that have been published primarily for a readership of women.

Currently published

10 Magazine (UK - distributed worldwide)
Al Jamila (Saudi Arabia)
All You (US)
Allure (US)
 (Denmark)
Amina (France and Africa)
 An an (Japan)
ASOS.com Magazine (online)
The Australian Women's Weekly
Avantages (France)
Azerbaijan Gadini (Azerbaijan)
Bella (UK)
Best (UK)
Better Homes and Gardens (US)
  Better Homes and Gardens (Australia)
  (Germany)
Bis (Japan)
Bitch (US)
Bona (South Africa)
Brigitte (Germany)
Burda Style (Germany)
Bust (US)
Bustle (US)
Canadian Living
Candis (UK)
Chat (UK)
Chatelaine (Canada)
Claudia (Brazil)
Cleo (Australia)
Closer (UK and France)
Cosmopolitan (US-based)
 Costume (Finland)
Croissant (Japan)
Curve
 (Sweden)
Darling (US)
Destiny (South Africa)
Diva (UK)
 (Italy)
Elle
elle (Brazil)
Essence (US)
 (Iran)
  (Denmark)
Family Circle (US)
' (Denmark)
Femina (India)
Femina (Indonesia)
 (Belgium)
First for Women (US)
Flare (Canada)
 (Colombia)
Gael (Belgium)
Glam (Malaysia)
Gloria (Croatia)
Good Housekeeping (US and UK)
Grand Hotel (Italy)
 (Italian-based)
 Guitar Girl Magazine  (US)
 (Greece)
Hänt Extra (Sweden)
Harper's Bazaar
Harrods Magazine (UK)
Hepburn (Australia)
Heat (UK)
Hello! (UK)
 (Sweden)
HGTV Magazine (US)
Hia (Saudi Arabia)
Homemakers (Canada)
In Touch Weekly (US)
InStyle
 (Italy)
JJ (Japan)
 (Finland)
 (Norway)
Ladies' Home Journal (US)
The Lady (UK)
 (Israel)
Latina (US)
 (Serbia)
Life & Style (US)
Lonny (US)
Love It! (UK)
Lucire (New Zealand)
Madame Figaro (France)
Margriet (Netherlands)
Marie Claire
Martha Stewart Living (US)
MaryJanesFarm (US)
 (Portugal)
 (Finland)
Moondance (online)
Ms. (US)
My Weekly (UK)
Naj (Poland)
 (Azerbaijan)
 (Egypt)
new! (London, France)
New Idea (Australia)
New Woman (India)
New Zealand Woman's Weekly
Nők Lapja (Hungary)
 (Malaysia) 
O: The Oprah Magazine (US)
OK! (UK celebrity)
Olivia (Finland)
Parenting (US)
Parents (US)
The People's Friend (UK)
Pick Me Up! (UK)
 (Sweden)
 (France)
Prima (UK)
 (Spain)
 (Soviet Union)
Real People (UK)
Real Simple (US)
Re(de)fining Magazine (online)
Reveal (UK)
Sakhi (Karnataka, India)
Sayidaty (Saudi Arabia)
Shape (US)
Star (UK)
Stylist (UK)
Suitcase (magazine) (UK)
Take a Break (UK)
Tatler (UK)
 (Macedonia)
Telva (Spain)
Texas Family (US)
That's Life! (UK)
 Urban Woman Magazine
 (India)
 (Sweden)
Verve (India)
 View Woman Magazine
Vintage Life (UK)
VIVmag (online)
Vogue
W (US)
With (Japan; has Chinese version)
WFO (Australia
Woman (UK)
Woman & Home (UK)
Woman Engineer (US)
Womankind (Australia)
Woman's Day (Australia)
Woman's Day (US)
Woman's Era (India)
Woman's Own (UK)
Woman's Weekly (UK)
Woman's World (US)
Women's Health (US)
Women's Running (US)
 (Iran)

Defunct women's magazines

 Ainslee's Magazine (1897–1926, US)
 Ain't I a Woman? (1970–1971, US)
 Al Fatat (1892–1894, Egypt)
 All You (2004–2015, US)
 The American Home (1928–1977, US)
 The American Jewess (1895–1899, US)
 Arthur's Lady's Home Magazine (1852–, US)
 Arthur's Magazine (1844–1846, US), merged with Godey's Lady's Book
 Audrey (2003–2015, US)
 Australian Woman's Mirror (1924–1961, Australia)
  (1855–1933, Germany)
  (1945–1957, Egypt)
 Blueprint: Design Your Life (2006–2008, US)
 Candida (1972, UK)
 Children's Party Magazine of Washington, D.C. (1991–1996, US)
 Chrysalis (1977–1980, US)
 Conditions (1976–1990, US)
 Cookie (2005–2009, US)
 The Delineator (1873–1937, US)
  (1908), Turkey
 Domino (2005–2009, US)
 Elevate Jiu Jitsu Mag (2016–2017, US)
 The Englishwoman's Domestic Magazine (1852–1879, England)
 Elle Girl (2001–2006, US)
 Ewomen (online magazine, for women from the Indian subcontinent)
 Family Health (1969–1991, US)
 The Farmer's Wife (1897–1939, US)
 Fatat al-Sharq (1906-1929, Egypt)
 Femina (198?–2010, South Africa)
  (1944–1957, France)
 Filament (UK)
 Fit Pregnancy (1993–2015, US)
 Fitness (1992–2015, US)
 Focus: A Journal for Lesbians (1970–1983, US)
  (1915–1931, China) 
 g3 (British magazine) (2001–2013, UK)
 Girl Germs (1990, US)
 Girlfriends (1993–2006, US)
 Glamour (1939–2019, US)
 Godey's Lady's Book (1830–1878, US)
 The Green Book Magazine (1909–1921, US)
  (1895–1908, Ottoman Empire)
 Harpies and Quines (1992–1994, UK)
 Hearth and Home (1868–1875, US)
 Heresies: A Feminist Publication on Art and Politics (1977–1992, US)
 Holland's Magazine (1876–1953, US)
 The Home (1920–1942, Australia)
 Home Chat, (1895–1959, UK)
 Home Notes, (1894–1958, UK)
 Home Monthly (1896–1900, US)
 Honey (1960–1986, UK)
 The Household Magazine (1900–1958, US)
 I Confess (1922–1932, US)
 Indianapolis Woman Magazine (1994–2012, US)
 Jane (1997–2007, US)
 Janus (1975–1980, US)
  (1978–1998, Turkey)
 Kartini (1974–2020, Indonesia)
  (1992–1999, Turkey)
 La Belle Assemblée (1806–1868, UK)
 The Ladder (1956–1972, US)
 Ladies' Magazine (1827–1837, US), merged with Godey's Lady's Book
 The Ladies' Mercury (1693, England)
 The Lady's Magazine (1770–1847, England)
 The Lady's Monthly Museum (1798–1832, England)
 The Lady's Realm (1896–1915, England)
 Lear's (1988–1994, US)
 Look (2007–2018, UK)
 Lucky (2000–2015, US)
 Mademoiselle (1935–2001)
 McCall's (1897–2002, US)
 Mingguan Wanita (1983–2020, Malaysia)
 Mirabella (1989–2000, US)
 Missbehave (2006–2009, US)
 MODE (1997–2001, US)
 Modern Homemaking, The American Needlewoman (1929, Maine, US)
 Modern Priscilla (1887–1930, US)
 More (1997–2016, US)
 More: for New Zealand women (1983–1996, New Zealand)
 Mothering (1976–2011, US)
 Muslim Girl (2007, Canada/US)
  (1920–1921, Iran)
 New England Offering (1847–1850, US)
 New York Woman (1986–1992, US)
 Nova (1965–1975, UK)
 NOW (1996–2019, UK)
 off our backs (1970–2008, US)
 On the Issues (1983–2008, US)
 On Our Backs (1984–2006, US)
 Pandora (1971–1979, US)
 Peg's Paper (1919–1940, UK)
 Peterson's Magazine (1842–1898, US)
 Pictorial Review (1899–1939, US)
 Playgirl (1973–2016, US)
 ROCKRGRL (1994–2005, US)
 Quarante (1984–1990, US)
 Redbook (1903–2019, US)
 Rosie (2001–2003, US)
 Sarinah (1982–1994, Indonesia)
 Sekar (2009–2013, Indonesia)
 Smith's Magazine (1905–1922, US)
 Spare Rib (1972–1993, UK)
 Sports Illustrated for Women (1999–2002, US)
 Sportswoman (1973–1977, US)
 $pread (2005–2010, US)
 Sudden Weekly (1995–2015, Hong Kong)
  (1869–1870, Ottoman Empire)
 Today's Housewife (1905–1928, US)
 Trouble & Strife (1983–2002, UK)
 U.S. Lady (1955, US)
 Velvetpark (2002–2007, US)
 Venus Zine (1995–2010)
 VIBE Vixen (2004–2013, US)
 Vice Versa (1947–1948, US)
 Viva (circa 1970s, US)
 The Woman Voter (1910–1917, US)
 Wanita (1969–2017, Malaysia)
 Woman's Home Companion (1873–1957, US)
 Woman's Journal (1870–1931, US)
 Woman's Realm, merged with Woman's Weekly in 2001
 Woman's Viewpoint (1923–1927, US)
 Women in Music (1935–1940, US)
 Women's Physique World (1984–2006, US)
 Women's World (1913–1921), Turkey
 womenSports (1974–2000, US)
 Working Woman (1976–2001, US)
 Young Woman's Journal (1889–1929, US)

See also
History of women's magazines
List of teen magazines, the readership of many of which are primarily young women
List of German women's magazines
List of men's magazines

References

Lists of magazines
Defunct women's magazines published in the United States
Defunct women's magazines published in the United Kingdom
Women's magazines published in the United States
Women's magazines published in India
Women's magazines published in France
Women-related lists